Lift to Hell (Chinese: 电梯惊魂) is a 2013 Chinese horror film directed by Ning Jingwu.

References

2013 films
Chinese horror films
2013 horror films